Caty Louette or Cathy Louët (1713 – d. after 1776) was an African signara and businessperson. She is one of the more noted profiles of the signare community of Gorée.

Caty Louette was the daughter of the Frenchman Nicolas Louët, an official of the French East India Company, and his African signare-mistress Caty de Rufisque of Gorée. Her mother was perhaps the first Gorée-signare who is documented.

Louette became the signare-consort of the Frenchman Pierre Aussenac de Carcassone, an official of the French East India Company.
Caty Louette are described as one of the most successful and prominent profiles in the slave trade of Gorée.  She could read and write, which was at the time not common, was described as the richest woman of the island and for some time the biggest slave owner of Gorée: in 1767, she owned 68 slaves in a community where most signares sold slaves rather than keeping them for their personal use.  In 1756, she commissioned the eldest of the still-standing grand European stone houses which came to be so famous for Gorée in the 18th century.

References 

 Lorelle Semley, To be Free and French: Citizenship in France's Atlantic Empire
 Mark Hinchman, Portrait of an Island: The Architecture and Material Culture of Gorée ...
 Trudy Ring, Noelle Watson, Paul Schellinger, Middle East and Africa: International Dictionary of Historic Places

1716 births
18th-century deaths
Senegalese women
18th-century businesswomen
18th-century French businesspeople
French slave traders
African slave traders
Signare
18th-century African businesspeople
Women slave owners